Barbara Jane Reams (a.k.a. Barbara Jane Calchera; born April 7, 1976, in Burley, Idaho), is a former American television actress.

Filmography
Television

External links
 

1976 births
Living people
American television actresses
People from Burley, Idaho
Actresses from Idaho
21st-century American women